The 1910–11 Colgate Raiders men's basketball team represented Colgate University during the 1910–11 college men's basketball season. The head coach was Ellery Huntington Sr. coaching the Raiders in his 11th season. The team had finished with a final record of 9–7. The team captain was John Lober.

Schedule

|-

References

Colgate Raiders men's basketball seasons
Colgate
Colgate
Colgate